The 1st Senate of Haiti was organized from the Constituent Assembly which drafted the 1806 Constitution. After the elected president and previous Provisional Chief Executive of Haiti Henri Christophe took up arms against the Senate, the Senate retaliated by stripping power from Christophe and electing Alexandre Pétion as president of Haiti in early 1807.

The Senate was the first legislative body in post-revolutionary Haiti, and was designed by Pétion to be a powerful body. However, Pétion tired of the Senate, and successfully pushed for a significant revision to the 1806 Constitution in 1816, including authorizing him to serve as president for life, as well as the transformation of the unicameral Senate to the bicameral National Assembly.

Members

References

Politics of Haiti